The long-footed water rat (Leptomys elegans) is a species of rodent in the family Muridae. It is found in the mountains of southern Papua New Guinea.
Its natural habitat is subtropical or tropical dry forest.

Distribution and habitat
The long-footed water rat is endemic to the eastern half of the island of New Guinea. Relatively few specimens of this rat have been observed, and its habitat includes secondary forest and old gardens, and it is presumed to be also present in primary forest.

Status
No particular threats are known for this species. It is sometimes hunted, presumably for food, but this is unlikely to be of much significance to the species. Previously classified as "critically endangered", the long-footed water rat has been found to have a much wider distribution and to be more plentiful than was once thought and has been reclassified as "least concern".

References

Footnotes

Bibliography

Leptomys
Rats of Asia
Endemic fauna of Papua New Guinea
Rodents of Papua New Guinea
Mammals described in 1897
Taxa named by Oldfield Thomas
Taxonomy articles created by Polbot
Rodents of New Guinea